In mathematical logic, true arithmetic is the set of all true first-order statements about the arithmetic of natural numbers. This is the theory associated with the standard model of the Peano axioms in the language of the first-order Peano axioms.
True arithmetic is occasionally called Skolem arithmetic, though this term usually refers to the different theory of natural numbers with multiplication.

Definition 

The signature of Peano arithmetic includes the addition, multiplication, and successor function symbols, the equality and less-than relation symbols, and a constant symbol for 0. The (well-formed) formulas of the language of first-order arithmetic are built up from these symbols together with the logical symbols in the usual manner of first-order logic.

The structure  is defined to be a model of Peano arithmetic as follows.
 The domain of discourse is the set  of natural numbers,
 The symbol 0 is interpreted as the number 0,
This structure is known as the standard model or intended interpretation of first-order arithmetic.

A sentence in the language of first-order arithmetic is said to be true in  if it is true in the structure just defined. The notation  is used to indicate that the sentence  is true in 

This set is, equivalently, the (complete) theory of the structure .

Arithmetic undefinability 

The central result on true arithmetic is the undefinability theorem of Alfred Tarski (1936). It states that 
the set  is not arithmetically definable. This means that there is no formula  in the language of first-order arithmetic such that, for every sentence θ in this language, 

Here  is the numeral of the canonical Gödel number of the sentence θ.

Thus no single formula can define , because 

but no single formula can define  for arbitrarily large n.

Computability properties 

As discussed above,  is not arithmetically definable, by Tarski's theorem.

 is closely related to the theory  of the recursively enumerable Turing degrees, in the signature of partial orders. In particular, there are computable functions S and T such that:

Model-theoretic properties 

True arithmetic is an unstable theory, and so has  models for each uncountable cardinal .  As there are continuum many types over the empty set, true arithmetic also has   countable models.  Since the theory is complete, all of its models are elementarily equivalent.

True theory of second-order arithmetic 

However, the generalization of Post's theorem to the analytical hierarchy shows that the true theory of second-order arithmetic is not definable by any single formula in second-order arithmetic.

 has shown that the true theory of second-order arithmetic is computably interpretable with the theory of the partial order of all Turing degrees, in the signature of partial orders, and vice versa.

Notes

References 
 .
 .
 .
 
 Tarski, Alfred (1936), "Der Wahrheitsbegriff in den formalisierten Sprachen". An English translation "The Concept of Truth in Formalized Languages" appears in

External links 

Model theory
Formal theories of arithmetic